Obinkita is one of 19 villages of Arochukwu. It was the capital of the Ibibio kingdom of Obong Okon Ita before its conquest by Igbo and Akpa invaders in 1690–1720. This town is significant in Aro History because Obinkita became the center where defeated Ibibio warriors were judged. This is why all Aro villages assemble at Obinkita during the Ikeji festival.

External links 
http://www.aro-okigbo.com/history_of_the_aros.htm
https://web.archive.org/web/20080828190518/http://www.aronetwork.org/others/confederancy.html
http://www.aronewsonline.com/origincivilization.html

Towns in Abia State